Weixler is a surname. Notable people with the surname include:

Dorrit Weixler (1892–1916), German actress
Franz-Peter Weixler (1899–1971), German photographer and war correspondent
Jess Weixler (born 1981/1982), American actress

See also
Wexler (surname)

German-language surnames